"Late Freight" is a 1948 instrumental by the Sonny Thompson Quintet featuring Eddie Chamblee.  The single was Sonny Thompson's second release to reach the charts and became his second and final number-one hit on the R&B chart.

References
 

1948 singles
Instrumentals